Alpha Kappa Alpha Sorority, Inc. is the first intercollegiate historically African American sorority. The sorority was founded on January 15, 1908, at the historically black Howard University in Washington, D.C., by a group of sixteen students led by Ethel Hedgemon Lyle. Forming a sorority broke barriers for African American women in areas where they had little power or authority due to a lack of opportunities for minorities and women in the early 20th century. Alpha Kappa Alpha was incorporated on January 29, 1913.

The sorority is one of the nation's largest Greek-letter organizations, having had more than 300,000 members in 1,024 chapters in the United States and several other countries. Women may join through undergraduate chapters at a college or university, or they may be invited to join by a graduate chapter after acquiring an undergraduate or advanced college degree.

Alpha Kappa Alpha is part of the National Pan-Hellenic Council (NPHC). The current International President is Danette Anthony Reed, and the sorority's document and pictorial archives are located at Moorland-Spingarn Research Center.

History

Beginnings: 1907–1912
In the spring of 1907, Ethel Hedgemon Lyle led efforts to create a sisterhood at Howard University. Howard faculty member, Ethel T. Robinson, encouraged Hedgemon by relating her own observances of sorority life at the Women's College at Brown University. Unfortunately, the ladies were not able to participate in the current sororities because of their race. To implement her idea, Hedgemon began recruiting interested classmates during the spring of 1907 and she and the ladies used the summer of 1907 to research and explore options for their new organization .

The women returned to Howard in the Fall of 1907 to work on the creation of the sorority. Hedgemon and Marie Woolfolk gave a presentation to the administration to secure approval, which was granted immediately. This approval made the sorority the first member of the divine nine to be created at an historically black college or university. Many have given the credit of this accolade to the Beta (second) chapter of Alpha Phi Alpha however the Alpha (first) chapter of AKA was accepted in November 1907. The Beta chapter of Alpha Phi Alpha Fraternity made its presence known on December 20, 1907, but it was not actually given permission to exist at Howard until the spring of 1908.

Informal sessions continued, with regular bi-weekly meetings beginning after the holiday. Wednesday, January 15, 1908, the 9 coeds held the first official bi-weekly meetings in Miner Hall. On February 21, 1908, the 7 sophomores invited to continue the legacy of the sorority were admitted without initiation and endowed with found status. In its first few months of life, Alpha Kappa Alpha cast the mold for its pattern of leadership in the activities of the campus. The Sorority developed a beautiful tradition of ritualic services and intimate social affairs for its members, cultural and civic presentations for the general public and varied academic, service and spiritual life for the university. The students began their "official" community service efforts on May 1, 1908, with the planting of ivy and a tree on the campus of Howard University.

The first initiation was held in a wing of Miner Hall on Howard University on February 11, 1909. On May 25, 1909, Alpha Kappa Alpha held its first "Ivy Day," a celebration that included planting ivy at Miner Hall. The sorority continued many service efforts that continue today. Some examples of service demonstrated before 1912 include helping create the NAACP, dc chapter, feeding the hungry and clothing the poor.

Incorporation: 1912–1913

Alpha Kappa Alpha continued to grow at Howard. By the end of the 1911–12 school year, there were more than 40 members of the sorority at Howard. In October, former President Nellie Quander received an invitation to attend a meeting of the sorority. In this meeting the group proposed to change the name, colors and symbols of the sorority. While the entire body of the organization was invited to be a part of the changes, Quander opposed the changes. Quander advised the group that they had no right legally or ethically to make such changes and advised them to hold a poll of the entirety of the sorority. That poll found that the vast majority did not favor the change.  As a result, some of the undergraduate women who wanted to make changes to the name, symbols and colors of the organization held a meeting the next month with other collegiate women desiring to become members of a negro sorority voted to continued with the changes. In this way, the women voted to reorganize, and allowed others to join and this group later became the twenty two founders of Delta Sigma Theta. Quander set up a committee that worked to incorporate ΑΚΑ as a perpetual entity. Alpha Kappa Alpha Sorority became the first African American sorority to nationally incorporate on January 29, 1913.

Expansion and implementation of programs: 1913–1940
Alpha Kappa Alpha continued to grow internationally, due to an effort that began in 1910 by the Alpha chapter of Alpha Kappa Alpha.  A second chapter at the University of Chicago was chartered in fall 1913. The sorority was the first a Black Greek letter organizations at Howard University to offer a scholarship program.  In addition, Alpha Kappa Alpha helped to support members by providing scholarship funds for school and foreign studies.

Alpha Kappa Alpha began to unite members at the annual Boulé, the sorority's governing body. The sorority's pledge was written by Grace Edwards and was adopted by the 1920 Boulé. In addition, the sorority's crest was designed by Phyllis Wheatley Waters and accepted in the same Boulé. A year later, at the 1921 Boulé, the Ivy Leaf was designated as "the official organ of Alpha Kappa Alpha," and Founders' Week, paying honor to ΆKΆ's founders was established. Pearls were first introduced to the sorority in the same year. The sorority membership pin was accepted in the following Boulé in Kansas City, Missouri. At the 1947 Boulé, pins for honorary members were designed and approved.

On May 10, 1930, Alpha Kappa Alpha, along with the fraternities Kappa Alpha Psi and Omega Psi Phi and sororities Delta Sigma Theta and Zeta Phi Beta, formed the National Pan-Hellenic Council (NPHC) at Howard University. Currently consisting of nine predominately black fraternities and sororities, NPHC promotes interaction through forums, meetings, and other mediums for the exchange of information, and engages in cooperative programming and initiatives through various activities and functions. This effort was first began by the sorority in 1921, when they sent telegrams to the then 7 other existing organizations to combine into a panhellenic.

Throughout the Great Migration, members assisted the Travelers Aid Society, to help thousands of Southern Blacks adjust to Northern society, find housing and navigate around the city.  They also volunteered at the Freedman's Hospital.

In April 1933, during the Great Depression, International President Ida Jackson visited All Saints Industrial School in Lexington, Mississippi. She found difficult conditions in the Mississippi Delta. Some of the teachers did not have an education past the seventh grade. African Americans were trying to make a living sharecropping on plantation land as agricultural prices continued to fall. In summer 1934, Ida Jackson initiated the Summer School for Rural Teachers to train future teachers. She worked with a total of 22 student teachers and 243 school children. In addition, she held night classes for 48 adults. By obtaining 2600 books for the school's library, Jackson made it "the largest library owned by white or colored in all Holmes County."

In summer 1938, Ida Jackson focused on poverty and established a regional health clinic. She had acquired $1,000 from the Boulé to fund the project in December 1935. The clinic evolved into the Mississippi Health Project, with Dr. Dorothy Boulding Ferebee appointed as the director.

The Mississippi Health Project brought primary medical care to the rural Black population across the state for six summers. The program has been recognized as the first mobile health clinic in the United States, assisting approximately 15,000 people in the Mississippi Delta. The project was noted for helping to decrease cases diphtheria and smallpox in the region and to improve nutritional and dental practices throughout rural Mississippi.

Led by incorporator Norma Elizabeth Boyd, the sorority created the National Non-Partisan Lobby on Civil and Democratic Rights (NPC) in 1938, later renamed the National Non-Partisan Council on Public Affairs. It was the first full-time congressional lobby for minority group civil rights. Throughout the organization's life, the Non-Partisan Council worked with the NAACP, National Urban League, The United Office and Professional Workers of America, The National Association of Graduate Nurses, the American Federation of Churches, the Colored Women's Club, the Brotherhood of Sleeping Car Porters and Auxiliary, and the New York Voter's League. The NPC was dissolved on July 15, 1948, by twelfth Supreme Basileus Edna Over Gray-Campbell. A year later, Alpha Kappa Alpha was the first sorority to apply for life membership in the NAACP.

To replace the NPC, in August 1945, Alpha Kappa Alpha established the American Council on Human Rights (ACHR). The council made recommendations to the government concerning civil rights legislation. The ACHR was proposed at the 1946 Boulé. In October 1946, Alpha Kappa Alpha was the first sorority to obtain observer status at the United Nations. On January 25, 1948, Delta Sigma Theta, Zeta Phi Beta, Sigma Gamma Rho sororities and Alpha Phi Alpha and Phi Beta Sigma fraternities were charter members of the ACHR. Kappa Alpha Psi later was included in March 1949.

On September 1, 1945, Alpha Kappa Alpha established The National Health Office in New York City. The National Health Office coordinated activities with local chapters and worked with the ACHC to promote health initiatives before Congress, increase the number of student nurses, and improve the state of health programs at historically Black Colleges and Universities. The National Health Office was dissolved in 1951, as its goals were incorporated into the sorority's international program.

Civil rights and educational training: 1950–1970
Throughout the 1950s, 1960s, and 1970s, members helped to sponsor job training, reading enrichment, heritage and youth programs. By encouraging youth to improve math, science, and reading skills, the sorority continued a legacy of community service and pledged to enrich the lives of others. Financially, Alpha Kappa Alpha expanded funding for projects in 1953 through the creation and trademark of a fashion show called Fashionetta. Politically, ACHR continued lobbying for equality concerning civil rights during the 1950s and 1960s. According to Collier-Thomas, the ACHR drew attention to legislation concerning education, transportation, employment, and improving equality in the armed forces and public places. The ACHR participated in filing civil rights cases in amicus curiae with Bolling v. Sharpe and 1954's Brown v. Board of Education. However, as a whole, ACHR voted to dissolve operations in 1963.

Alpha Kappa Alpha contributed programs for inner city youth by capitalizing on political gains in the White House. On August 20, 1964, President Lyndon B. Johnson signed the Economic Opportunity Act, which allowed the creation of the Job Corps. The sorority wanted to operate a job training center for students. Led by president Julia Purnell, ΆKΆ negotiated with the Office of Economic Opportunity to operate a women's center from October 1964 to January 1965. Alpha Kappa Alpha was awarded a $4 million grant (equivalent to $ million in ) to operate the Cleveland Job Corps on February 12, 1965, becoming the first sorority to operate a federal job training center.  Beginning in 1965, the Cleveland Job Corps trained female high school dropouts, aged 16 to 21, with job and educational skills. In 1976, the Cleveland Job Corps accepted males. The sorority operated the Cleveland Job Corps until 1995.

The sorority educated the community through highlighting the accomplishments of notable individuals by publishing The Heritage Series between 1968 and 1972. These pamphlets were a series of biographies of top African American women. Altogether, the entire collection contained "Women in the Judiciary," "Women in Politics," "Women in Medicine," "Women in Business," and "Women in Dentistry." Alpha Kappa Alpha also donated $20,000 for preserving Martin Luther King Jr.'s birthplace in Atlanta, Georgia, in the early 1970s. In 1978, during the sorority's seventieth anniversary, the Memorial Window at Howard University was dedicated to the founders of Alpha Kappa Alpha. Surviving founders Lavinia Norman and Norma Boyd attended the celebration of unveiling the Memorial Window, designed by Lois Mailou Jones.

Bridging toward the twenty-first century: 1980–2007

Soon after the sorority's 75th anniversary, Alpha Kappa Alpha contributed funds to decrease Africa's poverty with the establishment of African Village Development Program (AVDP). As a conjoint program with Africare, the sorority sought to decrease poverty in African villages. In collaboration with the International Foundation for Education and Self-Help (IFESH), the sorority built ten schools in South Africa after apartheid ended, and it donated computer technology to the region.

Since, 1990, the sorority continued to provide after-school mentoring programs, such as ON TRACK. ON TRACK, an acronym which stands for "Organizing, Nurturing, Team building, Respecting, Achieving, Counseling and Knowing," was designed to help the progress of 20,000 third graders who were at-risk of failing their education. Sponsored by Daimler Chrysler, ON TRACK was designated to "improve communication, academics, physical and emotional health, peer leadership, etiquette, and interpersonal relationships." In addition, programs such as the
Ivy Reading AKAdemy and Young Authors Program improved elementary reading comprehension skills, while P.I.M.S. highlighted programs in math and science.

The sorority responded to the call for help in fall 2005 after Hurricane Katrina, by raising money for a disaster relief fund. In July 2007, through Habitat for Humanity, the sorority helped build a house in New Orleans for a family that survived Hurricane Katrina.

In addition to educational programs, Alpha Kappa Alpha contributed to drawing awareness to health-related issues, such as AIDS, sickle cell anemia, breast cancer, and the importance of staying in shape. Recently, the sorority has supported the efforts of justice for the Jena Six. Also, the sorority connects to the past by partnering with African Ancestry. Sorority members may use African Ancestry's DNA testing to find genealogical data for themselves and their families.  The purpose of the partnership is to help members trace family connections through the world as well as in Africa, to embrace African American culture and the larger community.

Centennial celebration: 2008

Alpha Kappa Alpha celebrated its centenary with a year-long commemoration in 2008. The celebration coincided with the sorority's biennial Boulé. Internationally, some Alpha Kappa Alpha members began marking the festivities by making a pilgrimage to Howard University from January 12 to January 15, 2008. The activities included sorority members financially donating $1 million in scholarship funds to Howard University, contributing libraries for Middle School for Mathematics and Science and Asbury Dwelling for Senior Citizens, and unveiling a digital version  of the entire Ivy Leaf publication. In addition, sorority undergraduate and graduate members who were not available to attend ceremonies in Washington, D.C., held celebrations in local cities. On July 11 to July 18, 2008, Alpha Kappa Alpha held their 63rd Boulé. A town hall meeting with the public, a unity march in conjunction with other NPHC members, and a concert featuring R&B Grammy Award winning singer and Honorary Member  Patti LaBelle were some of the events which occurred at the centennial Boulé. On July 17, 2008, Alpha Kappa Alpha Sorority set a Guinness World Record when 16,206 members set a record by having the largest-ever silver service sit-down dinner in a convention.

Alpha Kappa Alpha's accomplishments were heralded by the United States Congress, with U.S. Senator Hillary Clinton and sorority member U.S. Representative Sheila Jackson-Lee, who both agreed to pass legislation in both houses of the United States Congress to commemorate the sorority's founding. In addition, the toy company Mattel designed a Barbie collectible doll fashioned with a pink and green evening gown.

Lawsuits, embezzlement, and IRS review of former president
On June 20, 2009, eight Alpha Kappa Alpha Sorority members filed a complaint in D.C. Superior Court demanding that International President Barbara McKinzie be fired for improper use of sorority funds and the money be returned to the sorority. The lawsuit claimed that Alpha Kappa Alpha Sorority, Incorporated's executive board approved the spending of substantial amounts on McKinzie's costs of living, including commissioning an expensive wax model of McKinzie, which cost $900,000. In response, McKinzie denied the allegations, describing them as "without merit."  The memberships of the eight AKAs who filed the complaint were revoked by the sorority in retaliation for the lawsuit but later forced to be reinstated by a judge.

In February 2010, the Superior Court of the District of Columbia dismissed the lawsuit. On August 18, 2011, the District of Columbia Court of Appeals reversed the previous decision.

On March 22, 2012, a forensic audit of Alpha Kappa Alpha's 2010 financial records revealed troubling concerns with past president, Barbara McKinzie's development and access to a "secret" bank account. The audit of the sorority led to findings that supported the claims in the previous lawsuit. The audit also found two former officials continued to use sorority credit cards after their service ended, failing to appropriately document charges. Another lawsuit against the organization, the former president McKinzie and other officials contained similar allegations. The audit found that McKinzie and the other officials secretly created a second set of financial books to get around the sorority's accounting policies. According to the audit, "(n)early $1.7 million in payments were made to the former president, Barbara McKinzie, without authorization. Approximately $282,000 in credit card charges on a second set of books appear to be fraudulent, including personal charges the sorority wasn't reimbursed for." The sorority later expelled McKinzie and won an arbitration award of $1.6 million against her, which (as of January 2017) was challenged by McKinzie in court.

Sigma Chapter hazing death lawsuit
On September 9, 2002, Kristin High (22) and Kenitha Saafir (24) from California State University – Los Angeles (CSULA), died following an illegal hazing activity. The women were instructed by members of Alpha Kappa Alpha to perform a series of activities blindfolded on Dockweiler State Beach when a high tide came and eventually drowned both of them.  The next day when the women brought Kristin's car and cellphone to her mother, she noticed her pledge journal missing from the car and numbers deleted from her cellphone. Prior to Kristin's death, Kristin's mother encouraged her to fully disassociate herself with the sorority after Kristin discussed inappropriate behavior by members of AKA. A year after the incident, the families of the deceased settled with Alpha Kappa Alpha Sorority Incorporated after filing a $100 million civil wrongful death lawsuit. The sorority denied having an active chapter at CSULA but this was dismissed by the court which found the sorority accountable for the deaths. No criminal charges were filed. The CSULA chapter had previously been sanctioned for hazing, and the sorority permanently expelled all members involved with this lawsuit.

Alpha Beta Chapter investigation
In May 2018, the Alpha Beta Chapter at Fort Valley State University (FVSU) was placed under investigation by the University System of Georgia and the Georgia Bureau of Investigations due to compelling allegations that the executive assistant to the university president and former graduate advisor of the chapter, Alecia Johnson, suggested low-income prospective members to have sex with affluent men in Georgia to cover approximately $1,500 in membership intake fees.  Johnson resigned from her position at the university and hired legal representation to contest the allegations. In June 2019, Johnson plead guilty to prostituting herself and one FVSU student.  Also as part of her plea deal, she testified against the men charged in the prostitution ring.  Her plea deal resulted in her getting five-years of probation, 180 days of house arrest, and a $1,000 fine.  GBI investigations led to indictments that included none of actual members of the AKA chapter. AKA's internal investigation into the matter was completed with the chapter remaining in good-standing with the sorority's highest leadership.

Gamma Chi Chapter suicide lawsuit
In a 2019 lawsuit filed in U.S. District Court of Illinois, the family of Jordan Hankins blames Alpha Kappa Alpha, Inc. for her 2017 suicide.  Hankins was a sophomore basketball player at Northwestern University who decided to pledge the sorority after receiving official membership.  While backwards pledging to gain respect from chapter members who went through a similar process, Hankins "was subjected to physical abuse including paddling, verbal abuse, mental abuse, financial exploitation, sleep deprivation, items being thrown and dumped on her, and other forms of hazing intended to humiliate and demean her," according to the lawsuit.  An official statement from Alpha Kappa Alpha, Inc. says the sorority is “deeply saddened” by Hankins’ death and declined to comment on the details of the complaint and her suicide due to the “sensitive nature” of the incident and “the ongoing grief her family is experiencing.”

Membership

Alpha Kappa Alpha has a membership of over 300,000 women internationally, with 90,000 active members of diverse backgrounds and professions. Graduate members constitute the largest percentage of membership. Alpha Kappa Alpha has over 1000 chapters, located in the United States, the Caribbean, Canada, and South Africa.

The term soror, derived from the Latin for "sister", is used between members of the sorority. Membership of the Directorate includes the board of directors. For graduate chapters, "Omega" is added to distinguish those which consist of college graduates from undergraduate chapters. "Supreme," as a term, is preposed to the title of an international officeholder, such as Supreme Basileus. Deceased members are referred to as "Ivies Beyond the Wall".

Honorary membership is Alpha Kappa Alpha's highest honor. Jane Addams, winner of the Nobel Peace Prize, is among the first honorary members. Eleanor Roosevelt, a former First Lady and wife of President Franklin D. Roosevelt, was made an honorary member. United States Secretary of State Hillary Clinton, former Senator and First Lady, and wife of President Bill Clinton, accepted honorary membership into Alpha Kappa Alpha. However, Clinton later declined initiation into the organization due to the sorority's exclusive requirement preventing acceptance into other Pan-Hellenic organizations, and desired her membership in Alpha Kappa Alpha to be "non-exclusive."

Membership interest and intake
The Ivy Leaf Pledge Club was the official pledge club of Alpha Kappa Alpha Sorority, Incorporated. Potential candidates who were interested in joining the sorority would join the pledge club before being inducted into the sorority.

In Our Kind of People: Inside America's Upper Class, Lawrence Otis Graham tells of his aunt's experience in joining the Ivy Leaf Pledge Club:

In addition, according to Graham, the sorority would have "Pledge Week", a period where a candidate's grades and behavior were reviewed by chapter members. Candidates who withstood this period were initiated into the sorority. Membership interest is processed by an interest meeting, known as a "rush". After the candidate receives an official letter from the sorority, she can participate in the membership intake process. Prospective members must have a 2.5 average or better prior to their membership submission, as well as a record of community service. If a prospective member has graduated, she could be invited to join the sorority at the discretion of the graduate chapter.

Leadership: Founders and Executive Directors
The leadership of the sorority in the early years was derived from three separate groups—the original group, the sophomores and the incorporators, who together are known as "The Twenty Pearls." The executive director position has been held by eight [now twelve] members since the office's creation on October 9, 1949.

Original group of 1908:
 Anna Easter Brown
 Beulah Elizabeth Burke
 Lillie Burke
 Marjorie Hill
 Margaret Flagg Holmes
 Ethel Hedgemon Lyle
 Lavinia Norman
 Lucy Diggs Slowe
 Marie Woolfolk Taylor

Sophomores of 1910:
 Norma Elizabeth Boyd
 Ethel Jones Mowbray
 Alice P. Murray
 Sarah Meriweather Nutter
 Joanna Berry Shields
 Carrie Snowden
 Harriet Josephine Terry

Incorporators of 1913:
 Nellie Quander
 Julia Evangeline Brooks
 Nellie Pratt Russell
 Minnie B. Smith

Executive Directors:

International Presidents
Listed below are the thirty International Presidents since the 1913 institution of the office.

Boulé

The Boulé is the regulating institution of the sorority and currently meets every two years. Throughout the years, notable individuals such as civil rights activists Martin Luther King Jr. and Roy Wilkins were speakers at past Boulé conferences.

Regions

After the establishment of 32 graduate and undergraduate chapters in 1924, Alpha Kappa Alpha Sorority organized chapters according to their regions in the United States and abroad. The Boulé determines the boundaries of the regions. The ten regions are each led by a Regional Director, where she serves a member of the sorority's board of directors. In addition to serving on the sorority's Board of Directors, the Regional Director also follows guidelines, program targets set by the International President, as well as procedures. Almost two-thirds of the sorority's Regional Directors have been elected as international presidents.

National programs

Educational Advancement Foundation

Alpha Kappa Alpha's Educational Advancement Foundation (EAF) is a separate and tax-exempt branch of the sorority, which "provide[s] financial support to individuals and organizations engaged in lifelong learning." The foundation awards academic scholarships (for undergraduate members of the sorority, as well as non-members), fellowships, and grants for community service.

History and donations
The foundation was the brainchild of Constance Holland, the sister of former Alpha Kappa Alpha International President Dr. Barbara Phillips, in 1978.  The foundation had official beginnings in 1980 and the sorority donated US$10,000 for the project. Eight years later, the organization first awarded $10,000 to fourteen students.  In 1991, EAF first awarded mini grants to community organizations.  In 1998, EAF provided the first Youth Partners Accessing Capital (PAC) award to an undergraduate member.

At the organization's twentieth anniversary in 2000, EAF published Perpetuating Our Posterity: A Blueprint for Excellence. The book served as a comprehensive history of the organization and as a source of advice for other beginning philanthropies. EAF went online with a website in 2003.

The organization celebrated a silver anniversary in Nassau, Bahamas, in 2005. EAF is incorporated into the International President's centennial program for funding under Excellent Scholarly Performance.  Overall, EAF has donated more than $200,000 in grants and awarded 1,400 students with scholarships. Other major donors to EAF include Continental Airlines and Northern Trust.

Projects

Advocates for Black Colleges – The purpose of the Advocates for Black Colleges is to raise  $100,000 for a selected historically black college and university, to support the institution's scholarships and program grants.  Corporations as well as minority graduates of historically black colleges are encouraged to donate funds as well.  The first college receiving aid is Stillman College in Tuscaloosa, Alabama.
Howard University Fund – Alpha Kappa Alpha is celebrating the centennial of the sorority's founding by donating $2 million to Howard University though two facets.  First, the Moorland-Spingarn Research Center houses the historical artifacts, photographs, documents, and recordings of Alpha Kappa Alpha's contributions to community service. One million dollars will be used to improve Alpha Kappa Alpha's archives. In addition, one million dollars will be donated to the Nellie M. Quander Scholarship Fund.  The fund will be used to finance partial or full scholarships for Howard University women in their junior and senior years.
Chapter Scholarships – Undergraduate and graduate members of Alpha Kappa Alpha Sorority's chapters send separate dues to the Educational Advancement Foundation to fund local scholarships. Depending on the size of the contributions by the chapter, the scholarships generally range from $100 to $500.  For a chapter to donate under the EAF's Endowment Fund, a chapter needs to raise $20,000.

The Alpha Kappa Alpha Sorority Traveling Exhibit chronicles achievements of Alpha Kappa Alpha members through the organization's one-hundred years. The exhibit appears in several cities across the nation from 2006 to 2008.

Ivy Acres
Ivy Acres will be a retirement center located in Winston-Salem, North Carolina.  The retirement center is sponsored by Senior Residences, Incorporated, a subsidiary of Alpha Kappa Alpha Sorority.  Ivy Acres will be one of the first retirement centers founded by African Americans and minorities in the United States.  It will offer assisted or individual living for individuals who are over fifty-five, regardless of background, ethnicity or religion. Barbara K. Phillips, former vice-president and Project Coordinator for Senior Residences, Incorporated, explains the purpose of Ivy Acres, "We determined that there is a need out there, but this will be open to all. We want to be diverse; we want to be multicultural. Anyone who wants to come will be welcome."

The gated community will be located on a  site. The planning for Ivy Acres cost approximately US$32 million. In addition, according to Business Wire, Ivy Acres will comprise "188 independent residential units, which will be both apartments and cottages, forty assisted-living apartments and twenty private accommodations for skilled nursing care." Residents are expected to pay $1,890 to $2,890 per month for services.

Ivy Reading AKAdemy
The Ivy Reading AKAdemy provides programs that encourage the entire community to become involved.  The concept serves as an educational and human resource center for programs provided by Alpha Kappa Alpha. Working with No Child Left Behind in mind, "The Ivy Reading AKAdemy," a reading initiative, focuses on early learning and mastery of basic reading skills by the end of third grade. The Ivy Reading AKAdemy has a $1.5 million proposal pending with the United States Department of Education to fund a three-year nationwide after-school demonstration project in low-performing, economically deprived inner-city schools in 16 sites within the continental United States.

Leadership Fellows Program
The Leadership Fellows Program is a fully funded event in which thirty Alpha Kappa Alpha Sorority sophomore and junior undergraduate members worldwide are individually trained for professional leadership roles. In addition, the fellows contribute to community service for one week. One of the selection criteria is that members must have at least a 3.0 GPA. The program initially was planned in 1978. In the following year, the first program was held in Indiana with twenty-nine students. Various cities around the United States have held the Leadership Fellows Program. In the past, Alpha Kappa Alpha has sponsored the event through the Educational Advancement Foundation.  Also, the program has been financed by Pillsbury, Tyson Foods, Johnson & Johnson, and most recently General Electric.

Partnerships in Mathematics and Science

Partnerships in Mathematics and Science (PIMS) began in Eva Evans's administration in 1994, and was a part of the SPIRIT program during the Linda White administration. Eva Evans mentioned the need for a math and science program, "As a college sorority, we've always advanced an educational agenda. We always had high GPA requirements.  And more than ever, we're pushing the importance of math and science for our girls.  We need more black women in those fields." The program's purpose is to increase the successes of youth in mathematics and science, as well as technology. Campaigns to highlight the program's importance were sponsored by the National Science Foundation and historically black colleges from across the country. Several chapters provided two-week math and science summer camps on college and day school campuses, which consisted of hands-on-learning through laboratory interactions, field trips to important sites, youth camps, and speeches from influential experts in specific areas of studies. For example, a PIMS program at Park Street Elementary School in Marietta, Georgia, consisted of third through fifth grade girls and provided educational field trips in order to stimulate involvement in math and science. Also, a national P.I.M.S. Olympiad, deriving from knowledge of math and science, in conjunction with the PIMS Community Parade was held at the 58th Boulé in Dallas, Texas.

Young Authors Program
In Linda White's administrations, the Young Authors Program was born.  The purpose of the program is to encourage and raise involvement in reading and writing in children in kindergarten through third grade. Each of the ten regions in the sorority had the opportunity to choose a child's story to be published in a two-volume anthology entitled The Spirit Within: Voices of Young Authors. In 2004, twenty children were honored in the first anthology.  The authors were recognized and performed book signings in the 2004 and 2006 Boulés. At the 2004 Boulé in Nashville, Tennessee, former Department of Education Secretary Rod Paige attended. On July 15, 2004, First Lady Laura Bush spoke on the Ivy AKAdemy's dedication to reading initiatives, "Teaching our children to read is the most critical educational priority facing our country. Children who do not learn to read by third grade continue to find reading a challenge throughout their lives. These expectations increase in amount and complexity each year."

Notable members

Many members of Alpha Kappa Alpha have become civil rights activists, educators, entertainers, and politicians.

Legacy
 The sorority is featured on the documentary series Profiles of African American Success.

See also
 List of social fraternities and sororities

Explanatory notes

References

Inline citations

Sources referenced

 
 
 
 
 
 
 
 
 
  206 pages; sociological study which combines ethnographic, archival, oral-historical, and other approaches

External links

Alpha Kappa Alpha Sorority, Incorporated Official Website
Alpha Kappa Alpha Sorority, Incorporated Centennial Celebration
Alpha Kappa Alpha – Educational Advancement Foundation, Incorporated
Ivy Leaf: 1921–1998 Microfiche Guide (PDF)

 
Student organizations established in 1908
International student societies
National Pan-Hellenic Council
Fraternal service organizations based in Chicago
Student societies in the United States
Women's rights organizations
African-American fraternities and sororities
1908 establishments in Washington, D.C.
Women in Washington, D.C.